The women's 100 metres event at the 1979 Summer Universiade was held at the Estadio Olimpico Universitario in Mexico City on 8 and 9 September 1979.

Medalists

Results

Heats
Wind:Heat 1: +0.5 m/s, Heat 2: +0.2 m/s, Heat 3: ? m/s, Heat 4: +1.4 m/s

Semifinals

Wind:Heat 1: 0.0 m/s, Heat 2: 0.0 m/s

Final

Wind: 0.0 m/s

References

Athletics at the 1979 Summer Universiade
1979